The Akron Poetry Prize is an annual contest held by The University of Akron Press. The competition is open to all poets writing in English. The winning poet receives an honorarium of $1,000 and publication of his or her book in the Akron Series in Poetry. The final selection is made by a nationally prominent poet. The final judge for 2017 was Oliver de la Paz. Other manuscripts may also be considered for publication by Series Editor Mary Biddinger. Past editor's choice selections have included books by John Gallaher, David Dodd Lee, and Sarah Perrier.

Winners 
Source.

1995: Susan Yuzna, Her Slender Dress, Judge: Charles Wright
1996: Clare Rossini, Winter Morning with Crow, Judge: Donald Justice
1997: Jeanne E. Clark, Ohio Blue Tips, Judge: Alice Fulton
1998: Beckian Fritz Goldberg, Never Be the Horse, Judge: Thomas Lux
1999: Dennis Hinrichsen, Detail from the Garden of Earthly Delights, Judge: Yusef Komunyakaa
2000: John Minczeski, Circle Routes, Judge: Mary Oliver
2001: George Bilgere, The Good Kiss, Judge: Billy Collins
2002: Roger Mitchell, Delicate Bait, Judge: Charles Simic
2003: Sharmila Voorakkara, Fire Wheel, Judge: Maxine Kumin
2004: Vern Rutsala, How We Spent Our Time, Judge: Robert Wrigley
2005: Ashley Capps, Mistaking the Sea for Green Fields, Judge: Gerald Stern
2006: Alison Pelegrin, Big Muddy River of Stars, Judge: B. H. Fairchild
2007: Brian Brodeur, Other Latitudes, Judge: Stephen Dunn
2008: Rachel Dilworth, The Wild Rose Asylum: Poems of the Magdalen Laundries of Ireland, Judge: Rita Dove
2009: Oliver de la Paz, Requiem for the Orchard, Judge: Martín Espada
2010: Joshua Harmon, Le Spleen de Poughkeepsie, Judge: G.C. Waldrep
2011: Emily Rosko, Prop Rockery, Judge: Natasha Sajé
2012: Seth Abramson, Thievery, Judge: Dara Wier
2013: John Repp, Fat Jersey Blues, Judge: David Kirby
2014: Philip Metres, Pictures at an Exhibition, Judge: Maxine Chernoff
2015: Sandra Simonds, Further Problems with Pleasure, Judge: Carmen Giménez Smith
2016: Aimée Baker, Doe, Judge: Allison Joseph
2017: Tyler Mills, Hawk Parable, Judge: Oliver de la Paz
2018: Kimberly Quiogue Andrews, A Brief History of Fruit, Judge: Diane Seuss
2019: Sean Shearer, "Red Lemons", Judge: Victoria Chang
2020: Aimee Seu, Velvet Hounds, Judge: Philip Metres

References

External links 
 University of Akron Press 
 Akron Series in Poetry
 Akron Poetry Prize Submission Guidelines
 University of Akron

American poetry awards